Spiderweb is an unincorporated community in Aiken County, South Carolina, United States.

References

Unincorporated communities in Aiken County, South Carolina
Unincorporated communities in South Carolina